Maung Sein Pe (born 1920) was a Burmese sprinter. He competed in the men's 100 metres at the 1948 Summer Olympics.

References

External links
 

1920 births
Possibly living people
Athletes (track and field) at the 1948 Summer Olympics
Burmese male sprinters
Olympic athletes of Myanmar
Place of birth missing